Griffin Hollow is a valley in Ralls County in the U.S. state of Missouri. The valley stream is a tributary to the Salt River.

Griffin Hollow has the name of David Griffin, the original owner of the site.

References

Valleys of Ralls County, Missouri
Valleys of Missouri